The Treaty of Versailles was a treaty concluded on 15 May 1768 at Versailles between the Republic of Genoa and France, in which Genoa ceded Corsica to France.

Corsica had been ruled by Genoa since 1284. In the 18th century Corsicans started to seek their independence. A German adventurer, Theodore von Neuhof, briefly became King of Corsica in 1736, supported by the Dutch Republic and Great Britain, which already possessed Menorca and Gibraltar in the Mediterranean Sea. In 1755 a full-fledged Corsican Republic was founded under Pasquale Paoli, and in 1764 Genoa asked France to send troops to the island. 

In the Treaty of Versailles, Genoa had no option but to put Corsica in pledge to France, to repay its debts. There was no chance that Genoa, which was in decline, could ever repay its debts otherwise, nor was Genoa capable of suppressing the Corsican struggle for independence. However, the treaty also established that France would return to Genoa the possession of neighboring Capraia island, previously occupied by the Corsican Republic.

In September 1768, France began its conquest of Corsica. France gained full military control of the island following the Battle of Ponte Novu in 1769, and until the French Revolution, the island was considered the personal possession of the King.

References 

Treaties of the Republic of Genoa
History of Corsica
Versailles (1768)
1768 in France
Treaties of the Kingdom of France
1768 in the Republic of Genoa
France–Republic of Genoa relations